Cleary Gottlieb Steen & Hamilton LLP (known as Cleary Gottlieb) is an American multinational law firm headquartered at One Liberty Plaza in New York City. Known as a white shoe law firm, Cleary employs over 1,200 lawyers worldwide.

History
The firm was founded in 1946 when six partners from the firm of Root, Clark, Buckner & Howland left to found a firm which they initially called "Cleary, Gottlieb, Friendly, & Cox." One of those partners was Henry Friendly, whose name was removed from the firm's name after he was appointed as a judge on the United States Court of Appeals for the Second Circuit in 1959. Melvin Steen was among the founding partners.

The firm has been more active on large merger and acquisitions deals involving Russian companies under sanctions or restrictions than any other law firm since 2010. The firm advised Russian state-owned energy groups Rosneft and Gazprom.

Offices
The New York office is situated in One Liberty Plaza, across the street from the World Trade Center site. The Washington office is located at 2112 Pennsylvania Avenue, five blocks northwest of the White House.

Notable lawyers
Some of the notable attorneys who have practiced at Cleary, Gottlieb, Steen & Hamilton LLP include U.N. Ambassador and senior diplomat George W. Ball, Judge Henry Friendly, and Melvin Steen. Current notable attorneys include former two-time SEC general counsel David M. Becker; former president of the New York City Bar Association Evan A. Davis; former SEC general counsel Giovanni Prezioso; a former FDIC general counsel; former Acting U.S. Attorneys for the Southern District of New York Lev L. Dassin and Joon Kim; and capital markets lawyer Leslie N. Silverman.

Alumni of Cleary Gottlieb include: Secretary of the Treasury Robert Rubin; a U.S. Supreme Court Justice; a President of the U.N. General Assembly; former RNC Chairman Michael Steele; Harvard Law School professor David Kennedy; Yale Law School professor Amy Chua; author Susan Cain; U.S. National Security Council Director for Russia; Belgium's Ambassador to the United States; Darren Walker, President of the Ford Foundation; and Renaud Laplanche, founder of Lending Club; David W. Leebron, President, Rice University; Jessica Neuwirth, Founder and Co-President, ERA Coalition.

Notable cases and mandates
Cleary Gottlieb has been engaged in several cases involving the restructuring of sovereign debt. "Over the past three decades," noted a 2012 Reuters report, "the firm has become the go-to legal adviser for countries" in financial difficulties. "In the past five years it has represented Greece, the Republic of Congo and the Ivory Coast." These include:

Advised Argentina in the 2005 restructuring of its $81.8 billion global debt, and in 2012 it represented Greece in the largest ever sovereign-debt restructuring and the largest ever bond exchange. But in 2014, a number of commentators criticized the firm severely for its handling of the Argentinian debt case.
In 2011, represented the Chinese company Sichuan Hongda Group in its $3 billion investment in Tanzania, a joint venture with Tanzania's National Development Corporation (NDC) that constituted the largest investment venture in East Africa to date.
In 2007, legal adviser to T-Mobile in its $2.4 billion merger with SunCom Wireless.
Defended the Republic of Congo in litigation in the United States arising from attempts to garnish Congo's oil royalties. 
Represented Mittal Steel Czech subsidiary in ICC arbitration claim brought by Dutch contractor.
Advised Google in its acquisition of Motorola Mobility.  
In 2012, provided legal counsel to T-Mobile US and Deutsche Telekom in connection with T-Mobile US's merger with Sprint Corporation.   
In 2012, international counsel to The Hellenic Republic in connection with its invitation, launched on February 24, relating to approximately €206 billion face amount of Greek bonds held by private sector holders, the largest ever sovereign debt restructuring and the largest ever bond exchange.
In 2014, represented Russia in the case of Yukos, a company that the Russian government had broken up in 2003, after arresting its owner, Mikhail Khodorkovsky, on charges of tax evasion. Courts in several countries later ruled that the Russian government's real intent was to destroy Yukos, seize its assets, and punish Khodorkovsky, a political enemy. The largest arbitration award in history, $50 billion, was won by Yukos' former owners against Russia. In April 2016, a Dutch Court of the Hague overturned the award.
In 2014, retained by the government of Puerto Rico, to help in the restructuring of its $72 billion public debt
In 2017, represented The Dow Chemical Company on the antitrust aspects of its $130 billion merger of equals with DuPont, the third-largest ever.
In 2018, represented the Walt Disney Company and 21st Century Fox on antitrust matters related to Disney’s $71.3 billion acquisition of 21st Century Fox assets.
In 2018, advised on the $146 Billion Sprint T-Mobile merger.

Buchheit and collective action
"Much of Cleary Gottlieb's success in sovereign debt," according to Reuters, "is based on the work of partner Lee Buchheit, who has led restructuring negotiations for 20 countries." Buchheit’s "academic papers, books and legal briefs over the past three decades fill much of the void where no formal law exists." For example, in 2002, "Buchheit developed a collective action clause, which says that if a supermajority of bondholders votes in favor of a restructuring, it becomes legally binding for everyone, even for those who voted against it." Buchheit was a lead author of a 2013 Brookings committee report that proposed changes in the approach to sovereign debt, including the collective action clause.

Awards and recognition
Law360 recognized Cleary in its "Global 20" List of Preeminent Global Law Firms, 2014 
Cleary was selected as the Americas Law Firm of the Year for 2015 and the Russian Law Firm of the Year from in 2013, 2014, and 2015 by the International Financial Law Review.
Legal Business ranked Cleary as its Law Firm of the Year in 2013.
Vault ranked Cleary Gottlieb as the #8 Best Law Firm in 2016, based on prestige to work for from branche-internal surveys. This was a decline from its position of #7 in 2015.
The Chambers USA Guide gave Cleary Gottlieb the Chambers & Partners' inaugural International Law Firm of the Year award in 2016. 

* In 2016, the website Vault.com ranked Cleary Gottlieb #3 for International Practice and #9 overall in its "Vault Law 100" list. Television producer Doug Liman has cited the firm as an inspiration for the T.V. series Suits.

Controversies

In August 2007, Manhattan federal judge Loretta Preska sanctioned Cleary Gottlieb for improperly trying to dissuade a witness, French-Congolese businessman Medard Mbemba, from testifying in Kensington International Ltd. v. Republic of Congo, in which Kensington, which was trying to collect on a nearly $57 million judgment against Congo and Cleary Gottlieb was representing Congo. The firm, Preska wrote, "has shown a willingness to operate in the murky area between zealous advocacy and improper conduct, and here it crossed the line." She imposed monetary sanctions on the firm and ordered that a formal reprimand be circulated to all of Cleary's 950 lawyers, and officially reminded Clearly "that it has obligations beyond representing its client."
In addition, Cleary attorneys have at various times taken controversial positions in front of U.S. courts. During an October 2013 hearing, Cleary partner, Johnathan Blackman, stated that if the court came to an unfavorable ruling Argentina would not "voluntarily obey." One observer noted that "Argentina's pronouncements, at the very least, have put Cleary Gottlieb in the awkward position of trying to explain to Judge Griesa why he should disregard the public proclamations of its client." Cleary has faced criticism from other commentators who have urged Argentina to fire Cleary Gottlieb, saying the firm failed to protect the national interest.
 In August 2014, Argentina published a two-page ad in The New York Times and The Wall Street Journal stating that it had not defaulted on its debt obligations. Judge Griesa called this a "false and misleading" statement and said that Argentina's lawyers were responsible for monitoring Argentina's statements. One report stated that Griesa, at a meeting in his office in Manhattan, "railed at Argentina’s lawyers from Cleary Gottlieb Steen & Hamilton following the publication of another so-called legal notice insisting the government has met its payment requirements and was therefore not in default." 	
The U.S. Department of Justice stated in 2014 that Cleary Gottlieb had given incorrect legal advice to BNP Paribas in regard to international transactions, resulting in penalization by US authorities that might otherwise be avoided.

See also
List of largest United States-based law firms by profits per partner

References

External links
 

Law firms based in New York City
Law firms established in 1946
Foreign law firms with offices in Hong Kong
1946 establishments in New York City